Jawed; Javed, Javid; Jawed, Javed is a masculine given name of Persian origin meaning of "eternal, immortal" and is also the word for "eternity".

The name is from Modern Persian  "eternal". The word continues Middle Persian jāwēd, from an Old Persian *yāvaitat, ultimately from *yauu-, Iranian oblique stem of *āiuu- "age, duration", cognate with  Greek αἰών "eon".

It is not a traditional given name; it was chosen as a pseudonym by Huseyn Javid (Huseyn Abdulla oglu Rasizadeh) in the early 20th century. The given name became popular among Indian Muslims from about the 1940s, and remains a popular name for baby boys in Pakistan.

List of people with this given name

Javed Khan (1695–1754) head eunuch and influential court official in the late Mughal Empire
Javid Iqbal (judge) (Sr.) HI, (born 1924), son of the poet-philosopher Sir Muhammad Iqbal
Javed Akhtar (cricketer) (born 1940), former Pakistani cricketer
Javed Ashraf Qazi, HI(M), SBt, (born 1941), Pakistani general, politician, Senator in the Parliament of Pakistan
Javed Akhtar (born 1945), poet, lyricist and scriptwriter from India
Musa Javed Chohan (born 1948), the former High Commissioner of Pakistan to Canada
Mubashar Jawed Akbar (born 1951), Indian journalist and author
Javed Ahmad Ghamidi (born 1951), Pakistani Muslim theologian, Quran scholar and exegete
Javed Sheikh (born 1954), Pakistani actor, director and producer
Muhammad Javed Ikhlas (born 1955), Pakistani politician
Javed Iqbal (serial killer) (1956–2001), Pakistani serial killer
Javed Miandad (born 1957), former Pakistani cricketer
Jawed Wassel (1959–2001), Afghan-American film director
Javed Qureshi (born 1960), former Pakistani cricketer and the first captain of the Pakistan U19 cricket team
Javed Jaffrey (born 1963), Indian actor, dancer, comedian, impressionist
Javed Kurd (born 1967), Pakistani-Norwegian music producer
Javed Omar (born 1976), Bangladeshi cricketer
Javed Qadeer (born 1976), former Pakistani cricketer
Jawed Karim (born 1979), Bangladeshi-German-American computer programmer and co-founder of YouTube
 Javid Taghiyev (boxer) (born 1981), Azerbaijani boxer
 Javid Taghiyev (footballer) (born 1992), Azerbaijani footballer
Javid James (born 1986), professional American and Canadian football wide receiver
Javid Huseynov (born 1988), Azerbaijani footballer
Javed Mohammed (born 1989), Trinidadian footballer
Javid Imamverdiyev (born 1990), Azerbaijani footballer (midfielder)
Javed Ahmadi (born 1992), Afghan cricketer
Javed Ali (born 1982), playback singer

Agha Javed Pathan, political activist from Sindh, Pakistan, accused of shoe throwing on Arbab Ghulam Rahim
Javaid Laghari, chairperson of the Higher Education of Pakistan
Jawed Ludin, Afghan diplomat
Javed Ahmed Khan, politician of the All India Trinamool Congress (TMC) party
Javed Khan (born 1956), Indian politician, Minister for Disaster Management in the Government of West Bengal
Javed Khan (born 1962), Indian film and television actor and former model
Javed Nasir, three-star general of the Pakistan Army
Javed Siddiqui, Hindi and Urdu screenwriter, dialogue writer and playwright from India
Jawed Siddiqi, Pakistani computer scientist
Javed Abidi, director of the National Centre for Promotion of Employment for Disabled People (NCPEDP) in India
Jawed Ahmad (Jojo), Afghan reporter working for Canadian CTV, arrested by American troops in 2007
Javed Ashraf Bajwa, retired Pakistan Army engineer officer
Javed Burki, Pakistani cricketer
Shahid Javed Burki, professional economist, Vice President of the World Bank, caretaker Finance Minister of Pakistan
Muhammad Javed Buttar, former justice of the Supreme Court of Pakistan
Javaid Iqbal, justice of the Supreme Court of Pakistan and a former Chief Justice of High Court of Balochistan
Javed Hashmi, Pakistani politician
Jawaid Iqbal, Pakistani born Hong Kong cricketer
Jawed Iqbal, Pakistani cartoonist
Javed Jabbar, advertiser in Pakistan, politician, former information minister
Javed Afridi (born 1983) ceo haier electronics and owner of Peshawar Zalmi a PSL franchise. 

Pseudonym
Huseyn Javid (1882–1941), prominent Azerbaijani poet and playwright of the early 20th century

Use as a surname
Pakistan

There is no tradition of Pakistani surnames.
Jawed is not one of the traditional family names, 
but it may be chosen as "secondary" name, and it may have been picked as "surname" by expatriates in western countries.

Hamid Javaid (born 1947), former Pakistan Army general, Chief of Staff to President Pervez Musharraf for six years (2001–2007)
Kanza Javed, Pakistani author and poet
Tariq Javed (born 1949), Pakistani-born Canadian cricketer
Nasir Javed (born 1966), Pakistani born American cricketer
Mohammad Javed (born 1969), Pakistani cricketer
Aaqib Javed (born 1972), Pakistani cricketer and coach
Amjad Javed (born 1980), cricketer who has played one One Day International for the United Arab Emirates
Sana Javed (cricketer) (born 1983), Pakistani cricketer
 British Pakistani
Sajid Javid (born 1969), Conservative Party MP, government minister
Umran Javed (born 1979), convicted terrorist supporter

Iran
Behrouz Javid-Tehrani, Iranian student arrested following the Iran student protests of July, 1999

References

See also
6262 Javid (1978 RZ) is a main-belt asteroid discovered in 1978
Dune Javid or Children of Dune, 1976 science fiction novel by Frank Herbert
Hayat-i-Javed, the biography of Sir Syed Ahmed Khan by Altaf Hussain Hali, the great Urdu poet who was also his friend and associate
Sholay-e-Jawed meaning Eternal Flame, Maoist political party founded c. 1964 in Afghanistan
Javid Nama, or Book of Eternity, Persian book of poetry written by Allama Muhammad Iqbal and published in 1932
Junaid Javed, Pashto musical band originating from Peshawar, Khyber Pakhtunkhwa in Pakistan

Pakistani masculine given names
Persian masculine given names